OSC Vellmar is a German sports club based in Vellmar, Hesse which has departments for budō, weight lifting, handball, inline hockey, Taekwondo, dance, table tennis, gymnastics, and winter sports.

History
The club's football team was established in 1918 and has played in the fourth division Oberliga Hessen since 2000 with the exception of the 2003–04 and 2007–08 seasons played in the Landesliga Hessen-Nord (V). Their best result was a second-place finish in 2013–14.

The origins of the club go back to the 1892 founding of Älterer Turnverein Obervellmar. In 1933, the association was forced to merge with Arbeiter Turn- und Sportverein 1907 Obervellmar under the policies of the Nazi regime which saw to the dissolution of worker's clubs which were considered to be ideologically undesirable. By 1934 the club was known as TuS Obervellmar and was renamed OSC Vellmar in 1976.

OSC plays its home matches at the Sportplatz Heckershäuser Straße which has a capacity of 4,000.

Honours
The club's honours:
 Hessenliga (V)
 Runners-up: 2014
 Landesliga Hessen-Nord (V)
 Champions: 2000, 2008
 Runners-up: 1999, 2004

Recent managers
Recent managers of the club:

Recent seasons
The recent season-by-season performance of the club:

 With the introduction of the Regionalligas in 1994 and the 3. Liga in 2008 as the new third tier, below the 2. Bundesliga, all leagues below dropped one tier. Also in 2008, a large number of football leagues in Hesse were renamed, with the Oberliga Hessen becoming the Hessenliga, the Landesliga becoming the Verbandsliga, the Bezirksoberliga becoming the Gruppenliga and the Bezirksliga becoming the Kreisoberliga.

References

Sources
Grüne, Hardy (2001). Vereinslexikon. Kassel: AGON Sportverlag

External links
 Official team site
 OSC Vellmar at Weltfussball.de 
 Das deutsche Fußball-Archiv  historical German domestic league tables

Football clubs in Germany
Football clubs in Hesse
Association football clubs established in 1918
1918 establishments in Germany